Street Child of Sierra Leone (commonly referred to as Street Child or SCoSL) is a United Kingdom-based charity employing local people in Sierra Leone which was founded in 2008 by Tom Dannatt, a businessman in London. Its stated mission is to reduce the number of children living on the streets by reuniting them with their families and putting them in long-term education.

Street children
ScoSL and their team of local staff have established day care centres providing food, counselling, clothing and medical care in order to encourage children to get off the street. These children are then reunited with their families who receive financial as well as managerial support from the charity so that they can set up small businesses and receive a steady income in order to be able to enrol, and keep, their child in school. In cooperation with a NGO in Sierra Leone called Help a Needy Child (HANCi-SL), Street Child has reunited over 1,000 street children with families and placed them into school. Reports by the charity have shown that 95% of the children in the program continue their education and stay off the street.

Every Child in School (ECiS)
This programme was set up by ScoSL in response to the 2nd Millennium Development goal, achieving universal primary education by 2015.

Every Child in School (ECiS) provides teacher-training, services and material provisions to impoverished, outlying rural areas where children have had no previous access to education.

Through the ECiS programme, twelve school structures have been constructed in remote, rural communities around Sierra Leone providing education for around 2,000 children.

Head count investigation
In 2011, SCoSL paired with StreetInvest, a British organisation, in cooperation with Sierra Leone's Ministry of Social Welfare, Gender and Children's Affairs, to conduct the first ever investigation into the actual number of children living in the streets of Sierra Leone.

The investigation was carried out by local volunteers with expert knowledge in the field who were able to identify and have access to key sites where street children could be found.

Patrons
 General Lord Richard Dannatt, Baron Dannatt, former head of the British Army
 Sia Koroma, First Lady of Sierra Leone
 Frank Timis, Romanian-Australian businessman

References

External links
 Street Child of Sierra Leone
 Kiln Sierra Leone Marathon

Charities based in London
Children's charities based in England
Organizations established in 2008